The cinema of Georgia has been noted for its cinematography in Europe. Italian film director Federico Fellini was an admirer of the Georgian film: "Georgian film is a completely unique phenomenon, vivid, philosophically inspiring, very wise, childlike. There is everything that can make me cry and I ought to say that it (my crying) is not an easy thing."

Notable films

 1992
 The Sun of the Sleepless
 1994
 Iavnana
 1996
 A Chef in Love
 1999
Here Comes the Dawn
 2000
 27 Missing Kisses
 2001
 The Migration of the Angel
 2005
 A trip to Karabakh
 Tbilisi, Tbilisi
 2007
The Russian Triangle
 2008
Three Houses
Mediator
 2009
The Other Bank
 2010
 Street Days
 Chantrapas
 2011
 Salt White
 Born in Georgia
 The Watchmaker
 2012
 Keep Smiling
 2013
 Tangerines
 Blind Dates
 In Bloom
 2014
Corn Island
Brides 
Tbilisi, I Love You 
Line of Credit
 2015
Moira
God of Happiness
The Village
The Summer of Frozen Fountains
 2016
House of Others
Khibula
 2017
My Happy Family
Scary Mother
Hostages
Dede
Namme

Notable filmmakers

Georgian cinematography’s reputation has been built by known cinema directors such as:
Vasil Amashukeli 
Alexandre Tsutsunava
Nikoloz Shengelaia
Mikheil Chiaureli
Mikhail Kalatozov
Revaz Chkheidze
Tengiz Abuladze
Eldar Shengelaia
Giorgi Shengelaia
Otar Ioseliani
Mikheil Kobakhidze
Sergei Parajanov
Lana Gogoberidze
Goderdzi Chokheli
Temur Babluani
Dito Tsintsadze
Nana Jorjadze
Zaza Urushadze
Giorgi Ovashvili
Levan Koguashvili
Nana Ekvtimishvili
Rusudan Chkonia
Zaza Rusadze

From 2012, the main focus of Georgian cinema is supporting script writing and European co-productions.

See also
 Cinema of the world
 List of Georgian submissions for the Academy Award for Best Foreign Language Film

Bibliography
Lauren Ninoshvili, Ph.D.: Singing between the Words: The Poetics of Georgian Polyphony, New York: Columbia University, 2011,

References

External links
Georgian National Film Center

 
Georgia